The Hopkins Public School District is a public school district in the U.S. state of Michigan. Hopkins Public Schools, a fully accredited, rural school district located in Allegan County, has been serving the Hopkins-Dorr community since 1844. It is one of ten Local School Districts in the Allegan Area Educational Service Agency (AAESA).

Serving a student population of approximately 1,550, the district offers two K-5 elementary schools. There is one 6th-8th grade middle school and one 9th-12th grade high school, as well as a 1-5 year-old Welcoming Schools program.

Academic opportunities include special education, gifted/talented, advance placement classes, and dual enrollment. The district provides many co-curricular offerings including interscholastic athletics, club programs, and fine arts.

The community approved a $21 million bond issue in 1996 which provided two new buildings, renovations to all facilities, and state of the art technology to enhance delivery of instruction via converged networking.

In 2007, the district passed another bond which provided $2 million toward infrastructure and classroom improvements.

Schools

Elementary School (K-5)
Hopkins Elementary School
Sycamore Elementary School

Junior High Schools (6-8)
Hopkins Middle School

High School (9-12)
Hopkins High School

References

External links
 

School districts in Michigan
Education in Allegan County, Michigan
1884 establishments in Michigan
School districts established in 1884